List of exhibits at the National Motor Museum, Beaulieu, Hampshire, UK.

References

Sources
 The National Motor Museum Trust - Vehicles

Lists of vehicles
Technology collections